A cityscape is the urban equivalent of a landscape.

Cityscape may also refer to:
 Cityscape (Claus Ogerman and Michael Brecker album), 1982
Cityscape (David "Fathead" Newman album), 2006
Cityscape Global
Cityscape Abu Dhabi
CityScape (Phoenix),
Cityscape (Dungeons & Dragons)
Cityscape (horse) (born 2006), Thoroughbred racehorse
4D Cityscape
Cityscape (2019 film), a Canadian experimental short documentary film
Scenes of City Life, a 1935 Chinese film also referred to as Cityscape in English
Cityscape, an academic journal published by the Office of Policy Development and Research